Jholana is a village in Mandi Bahauddin District, Punjab, Pakistan.

The community is an education hub, with three government schools and 4 private schools.

Villages in Mandi Bahauddin District